Vanlal Dawla (born 15 January 1947) is a Burmese boxer. He competed in the men's flyweight event at the 1972 Summer Olympics.

References

External links
 

1947 births
Living people
Burmese male boxers
Olympic boxers of Myanmar
Boxers at the 1972 Summer Olympics
Place of birth missing (living people)
Flyweight boxers